Óscar Vales Varela (born 13 September 1974) is a Spanish retired footballer who played as a utility defender, and sometimes as a defensive midfielder.

Club career
Born in Bilbao, Biscay, Vales appeared in one Segunda División B game for CD Basconia as the Basque club still not acted as Athletic Bilbao's farm team, which only took place in 1997. Aged 17, he was purchased by the latter and finished his football development there.

After a handful of matches for the reserves, Vales made his first-team debut on 6 April 1994, playing as a defensive midfielder in a 0–3 away loss against Real Oviedo. In the following decade he would almost never be an automatic first-choice for Athletic, but managed to appear regularly in various defensive positions; on 6 December 1994 he scored a rare goal, at Parma F.C. for the campaign's UEFA Cup, but his side lost 2–4 and 3–4 on aggregate.

Vales was loaned for two years to fellow La Liga club RC Celta de Vigo, playing UEFA Cup in his second season. In the summer of 1999 he returned to the San Mamés Stadium, managing to be regularly used during his second spell; however, after only two appearances combined from 2003 to 2005, he decided to retire from the game at the age of 30.

In 2008–09, after three years out of football, Vales joined longtime Athletic Bilbao teammate Aitor Larrazábal at regional side Gatika, the latter acting as manager. After one season he retired for good, having appeared in 236 matches in Spain's top division.

References

External links

Celta de Vigo biography 

1974 births
Living people
Spanish footballers
Footballers from Bilbao
Association football defenders
Association football midfielders
Association football utility players
La Liga players
Segunda División players
Segunda División B players
CD Basconia footballers
Bilbao Athletic footballers
Athletic Bilbao footballers
RC Celta de Vigo players
Spain youth international footballers
Spain under-21 international footballers
Basque Country international footballers